Clapboard Creek is a tributary of Matawan Creek in Monmouth County, New Jersey in the United States.

Clapboard Creek is located entirely within Aberdeen Township, flowing east into Matawan Creek.

External links
Matawan Journal, 13 Oct 1949, pg 4 col 6 Included a legal notice seeking to clear title of property for Laurence Harbor Heights Company against unnamed claimants. The land was bounded by "Clapboard Creek or Brook."

See also
List of rivers of New Jersey

Rivers of Monmouth County, New Jersey
Rivers of New Jersey